The Carnegie Medal of Philanthropy is a private award for philanthropy, bestowed every second year to multiple people by the Carnegie family of institutions. In recent years the medal has been presented in New York.

About the Medal
The Carnegie Medal of Philanthropy was inaugurated on December 10, 2001.
This award, created at the centennial observance of Andrew Carnegie’s official career as a philanthropist, is given to one or more individuals who have dedicated their private wealth to the public good.

Mission statement
The Carnegie Medal of Philanthropy honors Mr. Carnegie’s philanthropic achievements by recognizing the achievements of other philanthropists whose work:
 Reflects his breadth of vision and sense of private obligation to the public good;
 Is of significant dimension and has been sustained over time; 
 And has had a significant impact internationally or on a particular field, nation, or group of people.
In addition to providing international recognition to such individuals, families, and institutions, the Medal awards ceremony and associated events stimulate what Mr. Carnegie called “the business of benevolence” by widening the circle of international donors and advancing his driving commitment to giving.

The medal is awarded to philanthropists with vision for bold, broad, and permanent change, a long track record of giving, and who have also made an impact on their chosen field or community.

The award process
Each awards cycle, the Carnegie family of institutions nominates candidates for the Carnegie Medal of Philanthropy. These nominations are then reviewed by a selection committee composed of four members of the steering committee that organized the inaugural medal — Carnegie Corporation of New York, the Carnegie Endowment for International Peace, the Carnegie Institution for Science, and the Carnegie Trust for the Universities of Scotland — along with two additional Carnegie institutions, which rotate onto the committee each award cycle. William Thompson, great-grandson of Mr. Carnegie and former Chair of the Carnegie UK Trust, is honorary chair of the committee. Vartan Gregorian, President of Carnegie Corporation of New York, chairs the committee.

Each Medal recipient receives a bust of Andrew Carnegie — an original work of art cast in bronze and created specially for the award — and a bronze medal.

Selected recipients

References

External links
 Home

Humanitarian and service awards
Awards established in 2001